MotorCar was a Greek three-wheeler truck manufacturer, in business between 1967 and 1971. It was one of the smaller in its category, although rather "professional" in its quality of design and construction. Its models (all tipper) used a chassis developed by MotorCar, in two versions using Volkswagen and German Ford engines, respectively. According to their classification, both models could legally carry only 350 kg, although in practice they were loaded with up to 2 tonnes by their users.

References
L.S. Skartsis and G.A. Avramidis, 'Made in Greece', Typorama, Patras, Greece (2003).
L.S. Skartsis, "Greek Vehicle & Machine Manufacturers 1800 to present: A Pictorial History", Marathon (2012)  (eBook)
G.N. Georgano (Ed.), 'The Complete Encyclopedia of Commercial Vehicles', Krause Publication, Iola, Wisconsin (1979).

Defunct motor vehicle manufacturers of Greece
1971 disestablishments in Greece
Three-wheeled motor vehicles